Miss Venezuela 2013 was the 60th edition of the Miss Venezuela pageant held on October 10, 2013 at the Poliedro de Caracas in Caracas, Venezuela. At the end of the event, outgoing titleholder Gabriela Isler crowned Migbelis Castellanos of Costa Oriental as her successor.

For the first time, E! Entertainment Latin America aired the Alfombra Roja (Red Carpet) before the final event, hosted by Patricia Zavala.

The event started out with a tribute to the late long time pageant executive producer Joaquin Riviera who died earlier in the year.

Results 
Color key

{| class="wikitable sortable" style="font-size: 90%;"
!width="280" style="background-color:#787878;color:#FFFFFF;"|Final Results
!width="250" style="background-color:#787878;color:#FFFFFF;"|Candidate
!width="300" style="background-color:#787878;color:#FFFFFF;"|International Placement
|-style="background:#FFFACD;"
|Miss Venezuela 2013
|
 Costa Oriental – Migbelis Castellanos
|
|-style="background:pink;"
|Miss Venezuela International 2013
|
 – Michelle Bertolini|
|-
|Miss Venezuela Earth 2013| – Stephanie de Zorzi (dethroned)
| 
|-
|1st Runner-Up| – Wilmayerlin (Wi May) Nava
|-
|2nd Runner-Up| – Gabriela Graff
|-
|Top 10| – Yaró Serpa Distrito Capital – Andrea Lira – María Laura Verde – Roxana Marruffo' – Alicia Dolanyi
|}

Special Awards

Final Judges
Irene Esser - Miss Venezuela 2011.
Norkys Batista - Actress and model.
Daniela Kosán - TV Host and model.
Rodner Figueroa - TV Host.
Mayela Camacho - Model designer.
Ángel Sanchez - Model designer.
Marcelo Andreazzi - P&G Venezuela manager.
Natalí Ramírez - President of Poliedro de Caracas.
Ricardo Álamo - Actor.
Julián Gil - Argentine actor and model.
José Manuel Rey - Venezuelan football player.
Antonio Díaz - Venezuelan karateka.

Official Contestants
26 candidates competed for the title.

Contestants Notes

Migbelis Castellanos placed as semifinalist (Top 10) in Miss Universe 2014 in Miami, Florida, United States.
Michelle Bertolini unplaced in Miss International 2014 in Tokyo, Japan.
Stephanie de Zorzi was dethroned due to weight issues and did not compete in Miss Earth 2014. However, in 2016 the newly created Miss Earth Venezuela Organization appointed her to represent the country in Miss Earth 2016 in Manila, Philippines, placing as 2nd runner-up (Miss Earth Water).
Wi May Nava (Cojedes) was named Virreina (2nd place) in Miss Continentes Unidos 2014 in Guayaquil, Ecuador.
Gabriela Graff (Nueva Esparta) placed as 1st runner-up in Reina Hispanoamericana 2013 in Santa Cruz, Bolivia.
Andrea Lira (Distrito Capital) placed as 1st runner-up  in Reina Hispanoamericana 2014 in Santa Cruz, Bolivia.
Debora Menicucci (Amazonas) won Miss Venezuela Mundo 2014 and represented the country in Miss World 2014 in London, United Kingdom, but unplaced.
Irene Velásquez (Vargas) placed as 2nd runner-up in Top Model of the World 2015 in El Gouna, Egypt.
Ana Carolina Ugarte (Monagas) was appointed to compete in Miss World 2017 in Sanya, China, placing as semifinalist (Top 40)''.

Gala Interactiva de la Belleza (Interactive Beauty Gala) 

This preliminary event took place on September 19, 2013 at the Estudio 1 de Venevisión, co-hosted by Erika de la Vega and Mariela Celis. The following awards were given:

References

External links
Miss Venezuela Official Website

Miss Venezuela
2013 beauty pageants
2013 in Venezuela